Joseph Barry (born 1940) is an American real estate developer and co-founder of the Applied Housing Companies and founder of the Hudson Reporter newspaper chain.

Early life
Joseph Barry was born in 1940 to a Jewish family in New Jersey and raised in Newark, the son of Marion and Walter Barry. His father was a union organizer for the United Electrical Workers who started to develop low income housing in Newark after the 1967 Newark riots.  Barry earned a B.A. In English from Rutgers University and graduated first in his class from Rutgers Law School.

Career
Barry served as a clerk to the United States Court of Appeals for the Third Circuit. In the 1960s, he was associated with the left-wing Students for Democratic Society. In 1970, Barry and his father founded the Applied Housing Company. In 1971, Hoboken designated Applied Housing as their exclusive developer of Section 8 housing tasked with rehabilitating deteriorated buildings into affordable housing. Applied focused on renovating the existing housing stock rather than clearance and rebuild; they also believed in careful maintenance and management thereafter to preserve the stock. During the 1970s, Applied built and renovated thousands of units of affordable housing throughout New Jersey with a concentration in Hoboken, North Bergen, and Bayonne. The firm was given a great deal of credit for Hoboken's rebirth. In 1979, his father retired and Joseph Barry became president. He re-focused the company on constructing market-rate and luxury housing with a particular concentration on the Hoboken and Jersey City waterfronts including the $150 million, 1,160-unit Shipyard Development Project on Hoboken's waterfront; the 1,650 unit waterfront condominium community Port Liberté in Jersey City; and the 42-story luxury Palisades rental residence in Fort Lee, New Jersey. In 2001, Barry pleaded guilty to making five cash payments totaling $114,900 to former County Executive Robert Janiszewski to secure state and federal funding for the Shipyard project. Barry resigned from Applied Housing and handed the management of the now $108 million in sales company over to his two sons. Admitting guilt, Barry stated: "I made a terrible mistake. I take responsibility for it, and will get on with my life." Barry was sentenced to 25 months in federal prison, ordered to make $1 million in restitution payments, and fined $20,000. By 2004, Applied was the largest developer in Hoboken.

In 1983, Barry also founded the Hudson Reporter newspaper chain. He established Reporter newspapers in six other Hudson County towns: Jersey City, Weehawken, Secaucus, Union City, West New York and North Bergen. In 1999, he sold his share in the chain to minority partners and co-publishers David Unger and Lucha Malato. Despite being semi-retired, Barry remains committed to the urban redevelopment volunteering his time via his LinX Redevelopment company to rebuilding New Jersey's run-down cities with his latest focus on Passaic, New Jersey.

Personal life
Barry is married to Gail H. Barry and lives in Peapack-Gladstone. They have three children: David Barry, Michael Barry, and Lisa Barry Fleisher who continue to run the company and its sister company, the Ironstate Development Company. His son David is married to Kyra Tirana Barry, team leader for the U.S. Woman's Wrestling Team that competed in the 2016 Olympic Games.

References

American real estate businesspeople
20th-century American Jews
1940 births
Rutgers University alumni
Newspaper founders
Living people
21st-century American Jews